"I Love It When We Do" is the second single from Irish singer-songwriter Ronan Keating's second studio album, Destination. It was first released in Australia on 2 September 2002 and was issued in the United Kingdom seven days later. The single peaked at number five on the UK Singles Chart and reached the top 40 in Australia and Ireland. In 2003, Keating re-recorded the song with additional vocals from French actress and singer Cécilia Cara, re-titled "Je t'aime plus que tout". This version peaked at number 11 in France and number nine in the Wallonia region of Belgium.

Track listings

UK CD1
 "I Love It When We Do"
 "Solitary Song"
 "I Love It When We Do" (Groove Collision remix)
 "I Love It When We Do" (video)

UK CD2
 "I Love It When We Do"
 "Life Is a Rollercoaster" (live from Wembley)
 "Joy and Pain" (live from Wembley)
 "Life Is a Rollercoaster" (video—live from Wembley)

UK cassette single
A. "I Love It When We Do"
B. "Joy and Pain" (live from Wembley)

French CD single
 "Je t'aime plus que tout"
 "I Love It When We Do"

Credits and personnel
Credits are lifted from the Destination album booklet.

Studios
 Recorded at various studios in Los Angeles, London, and Dublin
 Mixed at Sarm West (London, England)
 Mastered at Gateway Mastering (Portland, Maine, US)

Personnel

 Gregg Alexander – writing, production
 Rick Nowels – writing, background vocals, acoustic guitar, acoustic piano, Mellotron, Wurlitzer, production
 Danielle Brisebois – background vocals
 Alex Brown – background vocals
 Sue Ann Carwell – background vocals
 Kristle Murden – background vocals
 John Themis – guitar, bazouki, percussion
 Rusty Anderson – electric guitars, bazouki
 Tim Pierce – electric guitars
 John Pierce – bass
 Charlie Judge – keyboard, sound design, Pro Tools editing
 Greg Kurstin – keyboards
 Wayne Rodrigues – keyboard, drum programming, Pro Tools editing
 Denny Fongheiser – cymbals, toms, percussion
 Dave Way – mixing
 Bob Ludwig – mastering

Charts

"I Love It When We Do"

Weekly charts

Year-end charts

"Je t'aime plus que tout" (with Cécilia Cara)

Weekly charts

Year-end charts

Release history

References

2002 singles
2002 songs
Polydor Records singles
Ronan Keating songs
Song recordings produced by Gregg Alexander
Song recordings produced by Rick Nowels
Songs written by Gregg Alexander
Songs written by Rick Nowels